Ashford United F.C. are an English football club based in Ashford, Kent. The 'new' United was formed in 2011, resurrecting the name used by the town's football club between 1891 and 1907. Following the demise of the original Ashford United club in 1907 and through to 1928 Ashford was represented by Ashford Railway Works FC and after that between 1930 and 2010 by Ashford Town F.C. The current club is effectively a 'phoenix club' having risen from the ashes of the financial ruin of its predecessor. Although not a supporter owned club, like most non-league clubs, it relies on contributions of volunteers and supporters.

Ashford United are currently members of the  following their record-breaking promotion from the Southern Counties East Football League in the 2016–17 season. They are one of very few semi-professional teams in England to have a synthetic 3G pitch, which is located at their home stadium 'The Homelands'.

History

For each season's League and Cup records of the Ashford clubs see List of Ashford United F.C. seasons.

South Eastern Rangers (1881–1891)

The roots of senior football in Ashford originate in 1881 with the South Eastern Rangers who played at Newtown Green (with dressing rooms in the adjacent Alfred Arms). The club reached the Final of the Kent County Badge competition (the fore-runner of the Kent Senior Cup) in 1886 and 1888 but lost on both occasions to Chatham.

Ashford United (1891–1907)

In 1891 the original Ashford United was formed when the South Eastern Rangers amalgamated with Kentish Express FC. Initially their home ground was behind the Victoria Hotel and the team kit was a white shirt (with blue Maltese Cross) and blue shorts. About 700 people yielding gate receipts of £5 were present for 'United's' first match on 19 September 1891, a defeat by the Highland Light Infantry 1–5. Two weeks later the club played their first FA Cup match, an away first round qualifying tie in which they were defeated 6–2 at Crouch End. Later, on 24 October 1891 Ashford played host to a touring Canadian team; the result was a  1–3 loss (Ashford’s scorer J Hamblin) in a match notable for the sending-off (for verbally abusing the referee) of one of the Dominion’s players.

In April 1893 the team exceeded the exploits of their fore-runners and defeated Chatham 2–0 to win the Kent Senior Cup (United scorers: Archie Munro and Frank Young) . Despite Ashford’s protestations that the match should have been played at a neutral venue, it was played at Chatham. Ashford had been the beneficiaries of a bye prior to the final – in the semi-final they were due to meet the West Kent Regiment but they were posted to Ireland before the match took place

The following season, in October 1893, in an 1893–94 FA Cup first round qualifying match Ashford United suffered their - and for every Ashford club thereafter - record defeat: a 12–0 loss to Woolwich Arsenal (for whom it was an all-time biggest goal difference equalling win). The tie was not without controversy as before the match it was reported in the Kentish Independent Newspaper that Arsenal, a team playing at a higher level (they had that season joined the Football League Second Division), expected a one-sided victory and had openly offered Ashford £20 and the promise of a friendly match against their second team in Ashford if they would scratch from the tie: the offer was not accepted.

The club were founder members of the Kent League in 1894–95 with a reserve side playing in Kent League 2, additionally the first team played in the East Kent League. In 1898 the club relocated to a new home stadium, an enclosed ground with a timber built stand at Godinton Road – the 1899 Kent Senior Cup Final (in which Maidstone beat Folkestone) was staged there.

In early 1900 two Ashford players, Gilbert Godsmark and George Foley were transferred to Second Division club Newton Heath. The former of these players is notable as the first signed for a transfer fee by the club that was shortly to become Manchester United. The fee of £40 was payable in two instalments with half paid immediately and the remainder after satisfactory completion of a trial period. However, after scoring four goals in nine matches; early the following year, Godsmark died of disease on army service at the Second Boer War – with Ashford reportedly serving a writ for the remaining £20.

The team, now in a blue and white striped kit, played in two successive Kent Senior Cup Finals, but were unsuccessful on both occasions. Season 1901–02 saw them lose a replay 1–4 to Sittingbourne (played at Ramsgate),  following a 2–2 draw (played at Faversham) in which Sittingbourne had scored a penalty two minutes from time to force the replay.  Then during the following 1902–03 season  they lost 1–2 to Maidstone with the tie played again at Faversham. During the early 1900s in addition to playing in The Kent League the club competed in the second division of the Thames & Medway Combination. In 1903–04 the team achieved a then club best in reaching the FA Cup 4th qualifying round, where they were defeated at home 0–2 by old rivals Chatham.

In 1907 owing to a lack of support at their Godinton Road ground, which being beyond the railway bridge was a fair distance from the town and their previous base in the Newtown area, the club was suffering from heavy debts and was unable to fulfill its fixtures and ceased playing mid-season.

Ashford Railway Works: (1907–1928)

Shortly after the demise of Ashord United a new club, Ashford Railway Works, was formed "through the instrumentality of Mr Walter Hole and others". The club's home ground was relocated back to Newtown (off Newtown Road, and under the railway arches on the Willesborough side of the river) on land believed to have been provided rent-free by the South Eastern & Chatham Railway.

Playing in red and green quartered colours the Ashford Railway Works club enjoyed considerable success. In 1908–09 they were East Kent Leaugue champions; the following season, 1909–10, they won the Folkestone and District Senior League and were also runners-up in Kent League Division 2 Eastern section; the railwaymen went on to win the latter league in four successive seasons, 1911–12, 1912–13, 1913–14 and 1919–20 (the latter after the break caused by the Great War): the Railway Works team had finished tied on points in both the 1912–13 and 1913–14 seasons with Folkestone Gas and Folkestone respectively but took the Championship by winning a deciding play-off match on each occasion.

The club became known simply as 'Ashford' upon the post-war resumption of the Kent League competition. Around this time the club acquired its nickname of the 'Nuts and Bolts' as many of the members were drawn from the ranks of skilled engineers from the railway. In the 1922–1923 season the team reached the semi-finals of the Kent Senior Cup losing to the eventually trophy winners Maidstone. In 1928 fate took a hand once more and the club folded leaving the Town with no senior club, although the Ashford Railway Works club did go out on a high as champions of the three team 1927–1928 Kent League Division 2 East.

Ashford Town (1930–2010)

Kent League: Pre-War (1930–1940)
The decision to found Ashford Town Football Club was taken at a meeting in April 1930 chaired by the editor of the Kentish Express, Sir Charles Igglesdon (although a club named Ashford Town had appeared on league lists in the pre-Great War period). The new club were elected to the Kent League and won their first match on 30 August of the same year at the railway works ground with visitors Canterbury Waverley beaten 4–2. In this first season the ‘Town’ club finished sixth in the 19 team league and were losing semi-finalists in the Kent Senior Cup to eventual winners Dartford who were also Southern League Championship winners that season.

In 1931 the club moved to a new ground, Essella Park, which was provided rent-free by Fred Norman. He was co-founder and co-owner of Norman Cycles and would go on to become Club President post second war. The rent-free arrangement remained in place until the 1950s at which time the club purchased the freehold for £2,060 and 7s – reputedly the sum Norman had paid for the land many years earlier.  The Essella park pitch featured a notable slope with the Willesborough end higher than the Ashford end.

In 1931–32 the 'Town' were runners-up in the Kent League to Northfleet United who at the time were a nursery team for Football League Division 2 team Tottenham Hotspur. The Ashford team scored an all-time club record 115 goals over the 36 match season and concluded the season with a sequence of only one loss (to champions Northfleet United) in their last 14 league matches (W12; D1; L1). This included consecutive league wins in the final six matches of the season which together with three straight league wins at the start of the next season created an all time club record of nine consecutive league wins. The 'Nuts and Bolts' Reserve side tasted success in the 1931–32 season by winning the Kent Amateur League Eastern section with an equally impressive goalscoring record of 84 goals over 21 matches played. The former Crystal Palace and Sheffield United forward Bert Menlove joined the club as a player in 1931 (scoring 25 goals in the 1931–32 season) and became player-manager of the 'Town' between 1932 and 1934.

The next season, 1932–33, was literally a season of two halves: for the first 17 league games the team won 12 matches with 1 drawn and 4 lost; the second 17 matches was a complete reversal with only 4 won and 13 lost which included a club record 7 straight league defeats. There was little significant improvement in the subsequent 1933–34 campaign: at mid-season the continued existence of the club, owing to lack of support and financial difficulties, was under threat; and in a Kent League game in March 1934, there was a record largest defeat for the 'Town' team with a 3–14 drubbing at Folkestone Reserves. The crisis were averted by a tie-up with Football League Third Division South Clapton (now Leyton) Orient who then proposed (unsuccessfully) that Ashford would enter the Eastern Section of the 1934–35 Southern League in place of their reserve side.

This association with Orient created the most high-profile game played in the early years at Essella Park: in the  1934–35 FA Cup First Round Proper Ashford were drawn against Clapton Orient. Town had won away at Kent League powerhouse team Northfleet United in the final qualifying round to reach this stage of the competition. The tie had extra spice as Ashford were in effect Orient's nursery team; they had loaned a couple of young players and transferred several players to the ‘Nuts and Bolts’, the most notably being former Liverpool and England full back Tommy Lucas whom Orient had appointed  as Ashford's manager. In a match that "lacked nothing in vigour and spirit" in front of 3,000 spectators Ashford fell 4–1 to their visitors. Another notable former Clapton Orient player appearing for Ashford between 1934 and 1936 was then record Tottenham Hotspur goal-scorer, and scorer of the only goal in the 1921 FA Cup Final, Jimmy Dimmock – in March 1934 on his debut for the ’Nuts and Bolts’ he scored twice and provided an assist in a 3–1 Kent League victory over Aylesford Paper Mills.

At the tail-end of their Kent League 1936–1937 matches, in a midweek home game in April 1937, the 'Town' team recorded their largest ever victory with a 15–0 rout of Erith & Belvedere.

The final home game played by the club  before the wartime suspension of Kent League matches was a 1-0 replay victory for the 'Town' in the 1938–39 Kent League Cup final, beating Bexleyheath and Welling after a 1-1 draw in the original tie. During the campaign the team created a club record of 8 consecutive league wins within a single season, scoring 36 goals whilst conceding 6. Harry Todd formerly of Margate (via their nursery deal with Arsenal) and Tunbridge Wells Rangers was player-coach of the team at this time and continued post-war.

For the 1939-40 season before the full wartime suspension of league football for the club, they played in the Eastern Group of the Kent Regional League finishing tenth of eleven teams.

Kent League: Post-War (1946–1959)
After the war in 1946 the club re-formed and rejoined the Kent League competition. In 1946–47 the club scored a post-war record single match goal tally (and post-war then record nine goal winning margin) in a Christmas day 11-2 demolition of Folkestone at Essella Park. The next day saw a 5-5 draw in the return match at Folkestone.

For the 1948–49 campaign Joe Fagg was appointed club manager (he had been associated with the club for many years including pre-war as Treasurer) and former West Ham United defender Charlie Walker joined as player-coach from Margate (where he had been the Kent League league winning coach for the previous two seasons - with a League, League Cup and Senior Cup treble in the latter). Under their leadership Ashford Town won the 1948–49 Kent League Championship; this top spot was decided by 'goal average' as there was a three-way tie at the top of the table with two other clubs (Dover and Ramsgate) finishing on an identical 52 points. In recognition of the achievement the club presented an engraved fountain pen to each player. The team scored 109 goals in their league campaign (second highest ever to the 115 scored in the 1931–32 season) and achieved a club record of 20 consecutive unbeaten league matches (W16; D4). It was almost a double celebration: the Ashford Town Reserves team were pipped to top spot in Kent League Division 2 by Folkestone.

The ‘Nuts and Bolts’ second string were eventually successful and took the Kent League Division 2 title in both the 1952–53 and 1955–56 campaigns. During the latter campaign they achieved a 21 league game unbeaten run (W16; D5). It was a particularly successful period for the reserve side who won the Kent League 2 Cup in both 1949–50 by defeating Ramsgate Reserves 4–1 and in 1952–53 (for the League and Cup double) beating Sittingbourne Reserves 2–1. The Reserves also appeared in four Kent Intermediate Cup finals: 1952–53 losing 3-1 to Dover Reserves; and facing Folkestone Reserves three times 1953–54 (won 2–0), 1955–56 (lost 2–1) and 1958–56 (lost 2–0). The Reserves rounded off the decade in the 1958–59 campaign with a 15 league game unbeaten run (W14; D1) – the 14 wins being consecutive.

Charlie Walker was succeeded in 1951 as player-coach by another ex-Margate man, Ken Horrigan. He took the team to the 1951–52 Kent League Cup final where they lost 3–0 to Folkestone.

In March 1953 David Nelson came in from Crystal Palace as player-manager: the first of his two seasons at the helm (1953–54 ) saw only 5 wins from 30 games, the lowest win percentage in the Towns’ Kent League campaigns. This included a run from November 1953 of only one win in the last 21 league matches of the season (W1;  D7; L13). There was little improvement the following season after which Nelson was replaced by Harry Freeman. His single season tenure, 1955–56,  continued the sequence of lower/mid table finishes. The following season was presided over by a Management Committee with a similar outcome.

The 1957–58 season saw the appointment of ex-Leyton Orient and Southampton full-back Ted Ballard as player manager. Despite a poor first season which included a run of 16 league matches with only two (back to back) wins (W2; D2; L12) and little improvement in final league positions from those previously, in his five years at the club Ballard guided the 'Nuts and Bolts' to notable cup success.

In the 1958–59 season the 'Town' team (and for a first time since 1893 a club representing Ashford) won the Kent Senior Cup; Kent League Ashford beat Southern League Tonbridge in the final at Gillingham watched by 5,061 crowd. Ron Vigar scored both goals in a 2–1 victory, the marker from Tonbridge being the only goal conceded by Ashford in their five matches in the competition. Tonbridge had hit both the crossbar and the post (from a penalty shot) during the game.

Earlier that 1958–59 season the team reached the FA Cup First Round proper for first time since 1934. At the start of the cup run in the preliminary round they produced a post-war, single match, record equalling goal difference and cup record 10–1 home victory over Betteshanger CW. The 'Town' then battled through four qualifying rounds culminating in a 4th qualifying round with a home replay victory over Southern Premier League Hastings United to reach the First Round proper. For this tie they hosted Football League Division 4 club Crystal Palace in front of an Essella Park record of 6,525 spectators, losing narrowly 1-0. The match was refereed by a youthful Jack Taylor who climaxed his career as referee at the 1974 World Cup Final. This season was the first of four consecutive appearances by Ashford (who remained managed by Ted Ballard throughout this time) in the FA Cup first round proper. For each of these years they would ultimately fall to teams from the Football League.

Southern League Division 1 (1959–1971)
The league competition in which the club competed, the Kent League which had been in existence since 1894 with Ashford United as founder members, was disbanded in 1959. Ashford joined-up to the  Southern League for the 1959–60 season, the first of a 44 year membership. The ‘Town’ were incorporated into the newly formed Division One (the second level of the Southern League) together with seven clubs from the Kent League, (Folkestone, Ramsgate, Margate, Dover, Bexleyleath and Welling, Tunbridge Wells and Sittingbourne). Additionally the league comprised the rumps of the former Southern League South East and North West Divisions together with two additional new recruits, Hinckley Athletic and Romford. Away matches for the team involved more extensive travelling with trips to amongst others Exeter City Reserves, Merthyr Tydfil, Kidderminster, Burton Albion and Cambridge City. The 'Nuts and Bolts' first match in the new league on 22 August 1959 and was an 8–1 reverse at fellow newcomers Hinckley Athletic. Four days later playing the other newly recruited club Romford in front of a 2,800 crowd at Essella Park, Ashford notched their first points courtesy of a 1–0 victory (scorer: Don Murfet). The team finished 14th of 22 clubs in the league in a campaign during which they suffered a six consecutive league match losing streak.

After successfully negotiating four qualifying matches, including winning away at Southern Premier League Gravesend and Northfleet in the last of these, the 1959–60 season witnessed the team's second successive appearance in the First round proper of the FA Cup: the result was a defeat 5–0 at Football League Third Division Brentford in front of a crowd of 13,900 – the largest single match crowd to see the 'Town' play. In making this round of the cup once again Ashford Town were awarded full membership of The Football Association.

But 1959 was not all about action on the pitch. In this year the club became a Limited Company. But a more visible milestone was the appearance of floodlighting at the Essella Road ground. The installation of the 'Do it Yourself' floodlighting was perhaps the best example of voluntary effort at the club. The self designed and installed system comprised eight 40-foot high towers each housing four 2,000 watt lamps and had required an up-rated power supply to be laid to the ground. The overall cost was £1,507.10s.5d. It is reported that only one match was lost in their 28-year lifetime - owing to a mains power failure. The lights were officially switched on with a Grand Opening Floodlight Game on Monday 19 October 1959 with First Division Chelsea the visitors. England forward and football legend Jimmy Greaves scored four goals in a 7–2 victory for the Londoners, with Ron Vigar and Gordon Burden netting for the home side.

After a single qualifying victory (an away replay win at Margate), the 1960–61 FA Cup campaign saw the club's exploits curtailed once again in the First Round proper, with a 1–2 home loss (Town scorer: Joe White) to Division 4 League club Gillingham. On the Gills teamsheet was forward John Shepherd who played for and skippered Ashford the following season. The cup run in that 1961–62 season was the next high-point in Ashford Town's history when the club reached, for the first time, the FA Cup 2nd round proper. Following a fourth round qualifying home win over Dover the first round proper match-up saw Ashford beat then non-league (Isthmian League) Wycombe Wanderers in a First Round replay at Essella Park 3–0 (scorers Joe White, Ron Clayton & John Shepherd). In the second round proper the 'Nuts and Bolts' lost 0–3 on home turf to Football League Division 3 Queens Park Rangers – playing for the visitors was Keith Rutter who would subsequently return to Ashford three years later to captain the team.

An Ashford Town record was created in 1961–62 with a run of a six consecutive drawn league matches (increasing to nine by including other competitive games). On the minor cups front that season the club won the Kent Floodlight Trophy, beating Southern League Premier Tonbridge 2–1 in a second leg replay (having drawn 1–1 in the first leg at Essella Park and 2–2 away in the second); but in the Kent Senior Cup final they were beaten 1–4 by Dover. In the latter competition, after an aggregate draw over two ties, the decider for the 1961–62 competition was unusually played at the start of the following 1962–63 season (watched by a little over three thousand spectators on neutral territory at Folkestone).

With former player Bert Sibley now as manager the team started the actual 1962–63 season with a run of seven consecutive winless league matches (D3; L4) and recorded only one win over the next six games giving aggregate figures of P13; W1: D4; L8. The team put this poor form behind them in the last match of the season and lifted the Kent Senior Cup for a third time by beating Margate 1–0 in the final played at Gillingham, with former England Youth player Brian Dellar notching the decider.

The next two seasons each saw single match goals record matches for the 'Nuts and Bolts' in the Southern League. The first was in February 1964 when the team thrashed Barry Town 10–1 (goals from with John Harris, Laurie Thompson, Bob Walker(2), Malcolm Collins, Paul Nicholas(3), Alec Garden and John Smith) - this also equalled the post war goal winning margin record. Less palatable and playing their third game in six days in November 1964 the team crumbled to a post-war record 0–8 defeat in a mid-week match at Crawley Town.

A further upshot of the disbanding of the Kent League was that the Reserve team also had to find another League in which to compete. In 1959–60 they were founder members of the Seanglian League (in effect a reserves section of the Aetolian League which itself comprised mostly disenfranchised former Kent League clubs). The second string team were winners of the 12 team Seanglian League in 1961–62. Two years later in 1963–64 this league morphed into the Metropolitan & District League Division 2 and the reserves endured a poor season with only five wins from 28 league matches - this included a run from December to the seasons end of only one win from 17 league matches (W1;  D5; L11). In 1966–67 the Reserves joined the reformed Kent League.

Although the club had for many years played in green and white, from the mid-sixties they adopted tangerine and white for their team colours for three seasons before reverting to their former colours in 1968–69.

At the start of the 1965–66 season the club appointed ex-England and Chelsea full back and First Division championship medal holder Peter Sillett as player-manager. The previous incumbent Bert Sibley had been replaced towards the end of the previous season by George Sergeant acting in a caretaker capacity. The first season for the new manager was the worst to date in the Southern League with 9 wins, 10 draws and 27 losses over the 46 game league season in which the ‘Nuts and Bolts’ finished 23rd from 24 clubs.

In the following 1966–67 season's FA Cup the ‘Nuts and Bolts’ battled through four qualifying rounds (beating in the last Sillett's previous club Southern League Premier Guildford City in a replay at Essella Park) to reach the first round proper where they defeated another Southern League Premier outfit Cambridge City 4–1 (2 goals each from Tim Soutar & Jim Roberts). The draw for the clubs second ever appearance in the second round meant a visit to Football League Third Division Swindon Town. The initial tie on the Saturday was postponed owing to frozen pitch at the County Ground. The re-arranged fixture provided no respite however with Ashford falling 5–0 to Swindon. 
 
Two years later during the 1968–69 campaign the ‘Nuts and Bolts’ had their best run in the Southern League Cup competition and reached the semi-finals; they were eliminated 3–2 at Southern League Premier Division (and that seasons League and Cup double winners) Cambridge United.

Victories in the first three FA Cup qualifying rounds during the early part of the 1969–70 season gave supporters hope of a run into the proper rounds of the FA Cup, but this was quashed by a home defeat in the 4th qualifying round to the previous seasons Athenian League Premier Division champions Walton & Hersham. The main prize however crystallised at the seasons end. Throughout its Southern League tenure the 'Nuts and Bolts' had been a mid/lower table team - their previous high point was 7th in 1963–64. But in 1969–70 under the managership of Peter Sillett this was eclipsed by a fourth-placed finish – a position that was rewarded with promotion to the Southern League Premier Division. Whilst the number of League matches won that campaign was not significantly greater than the previous few seasons the team was better defensively and conceded fewer goals and lost fewer matches. With sixteen draws from forty-two matches played (W 19;  D 16; L 7) the ‘Nuts and Bolts’ were the league leaders for drawn games - the season had started with an unbeaten nine match run of which six were drawn and three won. This promotion was a big step up for the club and represents their highest placing in the football pyramid; they were only one division below the Football League – indeed the 1969–70 Southern Premier champions, Cambridge United, had been elected to the Football League Fourth Division (there being no automatic promotion at this time).

Ashfords first match in the 1970–71 Southern League Premier Division was a 1–1 draw at home to Weymouth with Ashford equalising through Terry Street with the last kick of the match. Two days later Ashford (extremely) briefly topped the table courtesy of a 1–3 win at Margate. Notable performances during the campaign came from the men between the posts: the previous season's ‘keeper David Hills ceased playing early in the season; for several games a temporary replacement, former 1950's Chelsea goalie, Bob Robertson appeared; new custodian Brian Gambrill signed-on for £300 from Canterbury City  and conceded seven goals on his home debut in a 7–1 loss to Worcester City – 'Town's' lone marker was scored by David Gillingwater, a former Chelsea FA Youth Cup winner and England Youth international; mid-season Gambrill was injured and for several matches local amateur 'keeper Reg Gorham stepped in (echoing the make-up of the original Ashford United club he worked for a local newspaper). The latter back-stopped the team to a 4–2 home win against Hillingdon Borough to snap a 13 league game winless run (D4; L9). Later in the campaign the team endured a second sequence of one win in fourteen league matches (W1; D5; L8). With only eight wins all season and the highest goals conceded in the league (86) the 'Town' finished 20th (from 22 teams) and were thus relegated. Despite the lacklustre league campaign the team had progressed to the Kent Senior Cup semi-final, but lost the tie 4–3 away to Dover.

Southern League Division 1 South (1971–1979)
The demotion from the Southern Premier put Ashford in the now regionalised Southern League Division One South for 1971–72 where the 'Nuts and Bolts' recorded a 10th placed finish. The same season the Reserves reached the final of the Kent League Division One Cup but where defeated by  Chatham in the final.

The following season in the 1972–73 FA Trophy the club had their best ever non-league knock-out cup run. After battling through seven ties (including three qualifying rounds), the last of which was a 3–2 away win at Northern Premier League Bangor City, the ‘Nuts and Bolts’ reached the semi-finals  – just one match from a Wembley final. Alas the dream was not to be: in a match played on neutral turf at Peterborough they lost 1–0 to a disputed second half penalty to Northern Premier League Scarborough (who would themselves go on to win the trophy). Ironically for a club so linked to the railways, supporters travelling on a special train arrived 15 minutes after the kick-off following a delay en route.

In the senior trophy, the 1972–73 FA Cup, 'Town' were eliminated at the 4th Qualifying stage by Southern League Premier Guildford City. On the league front Ashford finished third in the Southern League Division One South, one place below the promotion places. Over all the season's matches Alan Morton set a club record scoring 46 goals in 59 games, which stood for 42 years until broken in the 2014–15 season.

There are two other notable events from the 1972–73 the season. Firstly Roy Hodgson, who has since had a distinguished club and country managerial career, including the England team manager for four years, played for the 'Town'. Secondly the club took part in European football in the appropriately named Cross Channel Competition. Teams from French towns near the coast (Boulogne, Saint-Omer and Hazebrouck) played similarly positioned English clubs (Ashford, Folkestone and Dover). Ashford fulfilled all their continental away and one home fixture but the competition fizzled out owing to fixture congestion resulting from the long cup runs which was exacerbated by bad weather and power blackouts (from industrial disputes in the UK).

Around the early seventies the club began looking for a new home stadium and favoured relocation to a site adjacent to the local authority's leisure complex close to Ashford town centre. However nothing was agreed and the search for new premises wasn't resolved until towards the end of the next decade.

During the 1973–74 season long-time manager Peter Sillett moved to Folkestone and was replaced by Dennis Hunt who moved in the opposite direction. Dennis had been a member of the Gillingham team that defeated Ashford in the FA cup in 1960–61. He brought with him Trevor Pearce who five years earlier had been plucked form non-league football by Arsenal.

A modicum of cup success was achieved in the 1974–75 campaign. Ashford won through five rounds (winning the last of these at soon to be promoted Southern League South Division Hillingdon Borough) to reach the FA Cup First round proper, with a home tie against Division 3 outfit Walsall. The scheduled Saturday fixture was postponed owing to a waterlogged pitch and moved to mid-week. Ashford's floodlights were deemed not of the required standard for an evening game so the match was played on the following Wednesday afternoon. In front of a modest but enthusiastic crowd of 2,623 (that included many schoolboys allowed the afternoon off from their schools) Ashford lost to Walsall 1–3 (Town scorer: John Hold). There was a ripple of performance too in the Kent Senior Cup where the team reached the 1974–75 semi-finals losing 3–1 to Southern League Premier Division Maidstone United. Later in the season manager Dennis Hunt was replaced by Reg Elliott who himself lasted only one year at the helm. During the latters' tenure first-choice goalkeeper Tony Godden was transferred for a very modest £1,500 fee to West Bromwich Albion who would, with him playing his part, come close to lifting the Football League League Winners Trophy in 1979.

For the 1976–77 campaign player Bobby Nash had taken the managerial reins. The club hit the local press for all the wrong reasons early in 1977 with a story that the club was £23,000 in debt and two weeks from bankruptcy. There followed a drastic re-organisation and effort both on and off the field which, over several years, restored financial equilibrium. League performance in 1976–77 was the worst recorded as a Southern League team with 5 wins, 8 draws and 21 losses over the 34 league games This included both a failure to win any of their first 11 matches (D3; L8) and, later in the campaign, a 13 game winless sequence (D3; L10). The team finished 17th from 18 clubs in the division. There was though a Kent Senior Cup semi-final contested by the team, this ended in a  3–2 home defeat to Bromley who were the eventual cup winners.

Bobby Nash was replaced as manager by Gordon Burden who assumed the player-manager role. Gordon had first played for the club in 1954–55 and he was in his fourth stint as a 'Town' player. On-field performance suffered as a result of the financial constraints and the team endured a run of lowly finishes. The 1978–79 season was a particular low point in which the 'Nuts and Bolts' scored an all-time record low of 28 league goals over their 40 league matches (in 18 of which they failed to score). In all competitions the team scored 35 goals in their total of 46 matches. Dave Clay top-scored with 8 goals and Peter McRobert next highest with 7. Over the next twenty years Peter made a club record 765 appearances for the 'Nuts and Bolts'.

Southern League Southern Division (1979–1999)
In 1979–80 there was a major reorganisation of non-league football with the creation in of the Alliance Premier League (the forerunner to the Football Conference and National League) which comprised the top clubs from both the Southern and Northern Premier Leagues. The Southern League itself was reorganised into a Southern and a Midland Division (with no Premier Division), with Ashford Town placed in the Southern section.

With the club maintaining its stringent financial policies and with stronger former Southern Premier teams (who hadn't made the cut into the Alliance) making up part of the opposition, lowly league finishes continued for the Town team. There was some light however as the team reached the Kent Senior Cup final for two years in succession in 1980–81 and 1981–82. On neither occasion were the team able to bring home the silverware, losing to Alliance Premier League teams Gravesend & Northfleet (2–0) and Maidstone United (3–0) respectively.

The Southern Premier Division was re-introduced for the 1982–83 season, with regional-based Southern and Midland leagues below. Ashford Town remained in the Southern Division (finishing eighth) and although ostensibly staying in the same league this was a slide down the football pyramid – now being in the third level below the Football League. Ashford had not played below at least the second level for 23 years.

The club also recorded an eighth place finish in the 1983–84 season and contested the semi-finals of the Courage Eastern Floodlit Cup, losing to Essex League Stansted 2–3 on a penalty shoot-out after the sides had drawn a two legged semi-final 3–3 – Stansted were having a stellar season and completed a cup quadruple of the Eastern Floodlit Cup itself, the Essex Senior League Cup, the East Anglian Cup and most prestigiously the FA Vase. Earlier in the campaign Ashford had won through four FA Cup ties to reach the fourth qualifying round where they were defeated 0–3 at Isthmian Premier League Barking. During the season Centre-forward John Young scored 42 goals over 59 matches – close to matching the 46 goal record of Alan Morton set 12 years previously.

For 1984–85 Gordon Burden was replaced as manager by Chris Weller. A slump to 19th position brought an end to Wellers' managerial reign; previous manager Peter Sillett was reappointed in his place. The turnaround from 18th position in the first season of this managerial spell in 1985–86 to League runners-up and promotion a year later in 1986–87 was striking. The promotion was founded on a tight defensive unit who conceded only 32 goals – the fewest in any season by Ashford Town. Sillett was the first manager to pilot the club to promotion since he initially achieved the feat back in 1969–70 season. The season also saw the 'Nuts and Bolts' contest a Kent Senior Cup semi-final, a 1–0 home defeat to eventual cup winners  Dartford. Assisting Sillet in the role of club trainer in both promotion seasons and in the intervening seasons too was George Sergeant. The former Irish Cup winner had previously played for the Town, joining from Hastings in 1952 and would fill the 'man with the magic wet sponge' role for many more years yet! completing a total of 52 years service to the club.

But the 1986–87 season wasn't all about promotion: it marked the season the club bid farewell to Essella Park as their home after 56 years. The final game on 2 May 1987 was a title decider against Dorchester Town, the 0–0 result meant the Dorset club pipped Ashford to the league title by one point. The club had been looking to relocate away from the ground, which was in a residential district and hemmed in by houses, for over 15 years and had looked at 17 sites. The directors purchased a plot of land for £80,000 a few miles beyond the immediate boundaries of the town in Kingsnorth and although they felt this was "not the ideal site" they could find nothing within the Town boundary. The project had an echo of that of forerunner club Ashford United who collapsed in 1907 having re-located too far from their core supporters. The seventy acre plot was undeveloped at the time of the final fixture at Essella Park; planning permission for the new 'Homelands' stadium was yet to be granted – the chairman of the directors was critical of "constant delays" by an "unhelpful" Ashford Council. The club were therefore without a home stadium: they agreed a ground-share at long time rivals Folkestone for the next two years.

With the 1986–87 promotion the 'Nuts and Bolts' moved-up to the Southern Premier League – now sponsored by Beazer Homes. Manager Peter Sillett left for Poole Town immediately following the promotion. His assistant Nicky Sparks took up the reins for a season achieving a creditable mid-table finish. Chris Weller was reappointed for the following 1988–89 season in which the club finished one place above the Southern Premier League relegation places.

The team returned to Ashford for 1989–90 season with the opening of the Homelands stadium, this boasted a capacity of 3,300 spectators with 500 seated. But it wasn't an auspicious inaugural season – with a run of 17 defeats in the final 19 league matches (W1; D1; L17) the team finished 19th of 22 teams and were consequently relegated back to the Southern Division.

The mid to late 1980s saw a run of near misses for the Reserves squad. In the Kent League Division 2 they were runners-up for four seasons: in 1984–85 to Sheppey United; in 1987–88 to Fisher Athletic; in 1988–89 to Hythe Town; in 1990–91 to Canterbury City; and were losing finalists in the Division 2 League Cup to Sittingbourne in 1986–87.

In the early 1990s there were several big-money and record transfers: in late 1990 forward partnership Jeff Ross and Dave Arter were sold to Hythe Town for a combined fee of £25,000  – a club record single receipt; three years later in 1993 a single player record of £20,000 was received from Sittingbourne for Lee McRobert; and the following year a record of £7,000 was paid by Ashford to Sittingbourne to bring Jeff Ross and Dave Arter back to Ashford. Arter holds the club record for scoring with 197 goals.

For the 1990–91 season in the Southern Division the 'Town' came under player-manager Neil Cugley who came in from Folkestone. He had previously been player-manager at Hythe Town, winning the 1988–89 Kent League championship. For the first five seasons of Cugley's tenure the fans saw a series of comfortable top ten league finishes. During this period the old cup spirit of the 'Nuts and Bolts' stirred: in 1991–92 they lost out in a Kent Senior Cup semi final 1–0 at Hythe; the following 1992–93 season they fought through four FA Cup ties to reach the fourth qualifying round where they were defeated 2–1 at home by Conference League Slough Town; later that season the team collected some silverware being victorious in the Kent Senior Cup final beating Isthmian League Premier Bromley 3–2 with Andy Pearson and Lee McRobert (2) netting; then in 1993–94 the Nuts & Bolts reached the semi-finals of the Eastern Floodlit Cup, but were soundly beaten 2–6 at Braintree - paying the price for the heavy toll of fixtures at the climax of the season, this match being their fifth game in ten days. That 1993–94 league campaign saw the 'Nuts and Bolts' finish in sixth place in the Southern Division, their results included a run between the 8th February and the season's end during which they lost only once in 22 league matches (W13; D8; L1).

There followed three seasons with the appearance of Ashford Town in the ‘proper’ rounds of the FA Cup for the first time in 20 years – manager Neil Cugley had been a non-playing member of Ashfords squad in their last appearance in the First Round in 1974–75.

In the first of these in 1994–95 the team won through 5 preliminary/qualifying rounds, culminating with a triumph at Salisbury City, to reach the  first round proper. The resultant home tie against Fulham was watched by a Homelands record crowd of 3,363. On a heavy waterlogged pitch, in a match televised by Sky TV, Neil Cugley's side achieved a more than creditable 2–2 draw against their Third Division opponents. Ashford took a two-goal lead (through Jeff Ross and Dave Arter) before two late controversial penalties both converted by Micky Adams rescued the league team. In the replay at Craven Cottage the 'Nuts and Bolts' took the match to extra time but ultimately succumbed 5–3 (with goals from Mark Stanton(2) and Nicky Dent).

That 1994–95 season, which saw a 5th place league finish, also marked only the second time in post-war football that Ashford scored in excess of 100 league goals – their 106 was second only to the 109 scored by the 1948–49 Kent League winning team. The team scored a total of 151 goals in all 59 competitive matches, with Dave Arter banging in 45 in his 55 appearances (one shy of Alan Morton's 1972–73 club record). This total included four league hat-tricks and in a pulsating home weekend season finale over 29 and 30 April Arter scored four in a 6–1 win over Bashley and the following day hit a treble in a 6–0 victory over Weymouth. For good measure a week later in the final match of the season he registered four in a 5–2 victory at Witney Town. These matches formed part of a run of seven consecutive league matches won by the ‘Nuts and Bolts’ (with an aggregate score of 26–7), this being a post-war league win record sequence at the time. Fast-paced winger Mark Stanton may have matched Arter's 45 goals had he not missed the season end through injury. His tally of 35 goals in 46 appearances included an Ashford Town record of five in a single game (a 6–1 Southern League Cup victory at Erith & Belvedere on 18 October 1994) and nine in the FA Cup run.

In the 1995–96 FA Cup, after disposing of Isthmian League Division 1 Aldershot Town at home in the final of four qualifying rounds, the first round proper draw saw Ashford away at their fellow Isthmian League club Bognor Regis Town. Ashford achieved a 1–1 draw on the south coast but then lost 0–1 at home in the replay. The match was a complete anti-climax; after being delayed by a power cut, Carlton Wynter then hit the post in the opening minute - the hosts just knew it just wasn't going to be their night. This was the first time the club had been knocked out in the 'proper' rounds of the FA Cup by a fellow non-league team. Perhaps fate was trying to save the supporters the trauma of a trip to Peterborough (the scene of the 1972–73 FA Trophy semi-final defeat) who awaited them in the next round.

The 1995–96 season was though a particularly successful campaign in other competitions for the 'Town'. On the county cup front they won the Kent Senior Cup beating Charlton 3–0 in the final with goals from Dave Arter, Andy Allon and Matt Carruthers. And most importantly in the league they won promotion to the Southern League Premier Division as a result of the team's second-placed finish to Sittingbourne in the Southern Division with a record of W25; D9; L8 over the 42 game season.

For the third FA Cup run, in the 1996–97 season, after a single qualifying round home win over Isthmian League Premier  Kingstonian, the first round proper tie saw Ashford again encounter Isthmian Premier opposition in the form of Dagenham And Redbridge. Following a 2–2 draw on home turf Ashford visited the 'Daggers' for the replay: the match ended 1–1 with Ashford progressing to the second round with a 4–3 penalty shoot-out win with the vital penalty scored by Paul Chambers (who would later become Ashford United manager). In the second round Ashford were drawn away at Watford. The 'Nuts and Bolts’ more than matched their higher ranked opponents in a goalless first-half, but eventually the Vicarage Road side ran out 5–0 winners, with substitute David Connolly grabbing a late hat-trick to guide the hosts to victory.

The clubs return season to the Southern League Premier Division (now with the sponsor Dr Martens) in 1996–97 was disappointing, the league results included a 15 match sequence without a win (D7; L8). With a finishing position of 19th (ensured only by winning their last two league matches) the club was only saved from relegation by the resignation of Sudbury Town.  This precipitated the end of Neil Cugley's seven year managerial reign (he moved on to Folkestone Invicta) and was replaced by Nigel Donn who had joined the playing staff the previous season from Dover Athletic. The results for the following 1997–98 campaign were worse, 29 losses from 42 matches was the highest loss ratio experienced by the Ashford Town club. This included a mid-season run of 10 league matches without a win (D2; L8) followed shortly afterwards by a club record equalling sequence of 7 consecutive league game losses. Unsurprisingly relegation couldn't be evaded and 21st place (from 22 teams) saw the Town return to the Southern Division for the following 1998–99 season where they finished 7th in the 22 team league.

But the big news for 1998 was not the relegation but rather the news of a take-over of the indebted club by a consortium headed by former England forward Rodney Marsh. In addition to clearing the club debts they planned a development of the Homelands site. The deal ultimately collapsed but the ownership of the freehold of Homelands became separated from the football operation. As a safeguard a trust of former club directors placed a covenant on the Homelands site which stipulated if it was sold for development that a new stadium had to be built. Another ownership consortium, fronted by John Gurney, surfaced but they became unable to continue financing the club. The Ashford Town club survived when Tim Thorogood acquired it in 2001 with a lease arrangement being struck with the owners of the Homelands freehold.

Southern League Eastern Division (1999–2004)
The league had engaged in another reorganisation and renaming exercise for 1999–2000 and Ashford now competed as a Southern League, Division One Eastern team. During all the ownership upheaval there was a merry-go-round of managers. In early 1999 the club appointed George Wakeling from Bromley. He persuaded former England international Paul Parker to take on the role of director of football. Wakeling had the team topping the league table in late autumn of 1999 - the side lost just twice in its first 18 league matches (W12; D4; L2). This run included an all-time Ashford Town record equalling (from 1938–39) eight consecutive single season league wins, scoring 21 goals whilst conceding only 4. During this up-beat early part of the campaign Lee McRobert scored for the ’Town’ in nine consecutive matches (in all competitions). Things then took a nosedive for Messrs Wakeling & Parker: amidst all the turmoil of the takeover and after a run of just one win in seven the pair were sacked on 10 January 2000. They were replaced by Tony Reynolds for the remainder of the season and despite a seven league match undefeated run (W5; D2) the mid season slump meant the team finished in sixth place finish in the 22 team league table.

From the 2000–01 season, in order to differentiate it from the similarly named club from Ashford, Middlesex, the 'Nuts and Bolts' had there club name officially extended to Ashford Town (Kent). In the campaign Tommy Sampson (who had taken Deal Town to victory in the FA vase final the previous season) came in as manager and the team advanced to the 4th round (the last 32) of the FA trophy. They were defeated in Weymouth 1–3 to end 'Town's' best run in the competition since 1972–73.  Tim Thorogood who by now owned the club assumed team management from Sampson for the final third of the 2000–01 season during which the team endured a run of results containing only one win in their last 14 league matches (W1; D3; L10). As a measure of the disruption to the team a total of 51 different players appeared in the Town shirt over the 42 match campaign.

The 2001–02 started in the same vein as the previous with only one win in the first ten games (W1; D1; L8). Performances picked up as the season progressed and the team reached the semi-finals of the Kent Senior Cup where they were on the wrong end of a heavy 5–0 defeat at Football Conference club Margate.

For 2002–2003 the team moved away from their green and white strip and played in lime green shirts and blue shorts. Under the relative stability of Thorogoods managership there were four seasons to 2003–2004 of mid table finishes by the 'Nuts and Bolts' in the Division 1 Eastern of the Southern League. The last of these marked Ashford's final season as a Southern League club after 44 years under their umbrella – there was more reorganisation afoot of the non-league scene.

Isthmian League Division One / Southern (2004–2010)
The 2004–05 season reorganisation was brought about by the introduction of a North and South regional Conference leagues below the Premier. There was also the establishment of boundaries between the Southern  and Isthmian  leagues (which hitherto had overlapped). As a result Ashford Town were allocated to the Ryman sponsored Isthmian League Division One. This was a further demotion down the non-league structure, with the clubs new league referred to as 'step 4' of non-league football (i.e. four levels below the Football League).

In September 2004 owner/manager Tim Thorogood appointed former England player Terry Fenwick as manager. He quit four months later claiming a vast turnover of players had not allowed a settled squad:  thirty-five players had been used during a run of poor results of just two wins in 16 league matches (W2; D6: L8). Thorogood resumed as manager and the team finished the season 20th of 22 teams.

Supporters concerns for the existence of the club were raised in the summer of 2005 by a carry-over from the takeover/ground ownership saga of a few years previously; it was claimed the club had not paid rent (of £2,500pa) for three years and additionally had £12,000 unpaid arrears with the Inland Revenue. The issues were subsequently all resolved and Thorogood remained in control of the club. Under the joint managership of himself and John Cumberbatch team performances in the league in 2005–06 continued in a poor vein with only 2 wins in the teams first 23 league games (W2; D7; L14). The Town ended the league campaign as 21st from 23 teams.

For the following season the league split into two regional divisions with 'Nuts and Bolts' in the Southern division for 2006–07. There was a managerial change in October when John Cumberbatch was appointed sole manager from the role of joint-manager he had held the previous season. The league finish, incorporating a mid-season run of one win in 15 league matches (W1; D4; L10), was poor (18th from 22 teams) but there was a Kent Senior Cup semi-final contested (a 5–0 heavy home defeat by Isthmian Premier Bromley). Success was achieved though by the back-room staff led by Elaine Osbourne who won an award for the division’s best club match day programme.

March 2007 saw further changes in ownership of the club. Tim Thorogood sold ownership to a new joint-ownership team of Tony Betteridge and Don Crosbie. They had acquired the freehold interest in the Homelands site in 2006 and crucially this transaction reunited ownership of the club and stadium. They also announced that Arsenal and England striker Ian Wright was to become director of football strategy at the club.

The start of the 2007–08 season saw former Northampton Town and Dover manager Clive Walker appointed as manager and the team returned to a green and white strip. The directors reported they had spent half a million pounds in refurbishing the Homelands facilities. Despite a respectable record over his 12 league game matches in charge (W5; D4; L3) Walker didn't last long and he was replaced as manager at the end of October by former Wales International Steve Lovell.

There was minor triumph for the club in 2007–08 with the Reserve team winning the Kent League 2 Cup (defeating Dartford) and finishing as Kent League Division 2 runners-up (to Dover).

Lovell managed the club to a couple of respectable upper-mid table finishes but most of the action over the next couple of years seasons took place off the field. In the summer of 2008 Director Crosbie announced plans for a Sports Village at Homelands. But within a year the relationship between the joint-owners Betteridge and Crosbie turned sour and a year later the boardroom dispute escalated. The split in the boardroom affected the on-field performances in the 2009–10 campaign - under the continued managership of Steve Lovell the club barely clung to their Division One status finishing 20th of 22 teams. There were league game sequences of both a 14 match winless run (D6; L8) and a run of one win in 11 (W1; D3; L7). The Ashford Town club did though win their final game on 4 April 2010, a 2–1 victory over Chatham.
 
At the end of the season there was an impasse at boardroom level and the club were in debt to Ebbsfleet United Under Football Association rules whilst this remained unpaid they were suspended from competition. In the courts the row between Betteridge and Crosbie was finally resolved with financial administration for the club and Betteridge then buying the assets of the club from the administrator. However the settlement came too late for the club to compete in the 2010–11 season.

The summer of 2010 therefore marked the end of Ashford Town FC after a history of 80 years. During this time they had won only one League championship, the Kent league in 1948–49 and had enjoyed a few promotions and cup exploits along the way. Although relegation had usually followed shortly after the promotions the post war record of the team was that they had never for any season finished bottom of their League – albeit it was close on more than one occasion!

Ashford United (2011–    )

Kent Invicta League (2011–2013)
During what transpired to be a short one-season hiatus the club was reformed as Ashford United – a revival of the name used between 1891 and 1907. The club adopted the same crest as their immediate forerunners, Ashford Town, except the word 'United' replaced 'Town' and the simple wording 'Founded 1930' was expanded to 'Founded 1891, Reformed 2011'. The home stadium for the club remained at 'The Homelands'.
 
Under FA rules the 'new' Ashford United were not permitted to re-join the league where their predecessors had left-off, so for their inaugural season of 2011–12 they were placed into 'step 6' football in the newly formed Kent Invicta League. Initially in 2011 the club appointed former manager Tony Reynolds as manager but owing to personal commitments he stepped aside before competitive games commenced and Paul Chambers took up the reins. After an indifferent start to their first season results improved over the second half (including a ten league match unbeaten run (W5; D5)) and the team finished in fifth position.

The teams' finishing position improved two places in the 2012–13 season to third, with the new "United" unbeaten in their first twelve league games (W10; D2) and setting a record with six straight league victories (two less than the Ashford Town record) - an individual United player record was set by Mo Takalo (Takalobighashi) who scored in each of these six matches. Although only the two top teams in the league were eligible for automatic promotion to the Kent League, Ashford United were awarded promotion in place of the second placed Hollands & Blair who didn’t have the facilities and ground grading to take the promotion.

Kent League / Southern Counties East Football League (2013–2017)
During the close season the Kent League renamed itself as the Southern Counties East Football League. The names of opposing clubs were more familiar to long-time Ashford supporters than in the previous league with clubs from Canterbury, Deal and Tunbridge Wells as opponents. After a positive start on the pitch to the 2013–14 season it was announced in November 2013 by owner Tony Betteridge that he had relinquished ownership of the club and the Homelands freehold to a company who had as a director the wife of Don Crosbie – the director he had fought for ownership of the club back in 2010. In the 2013–14 season's cup competitions the team reached the last 32 of the FA Vase competition (losing 1–2 at home to Hanwell Town, that seasons champions of the Spartan South Midlands Football League) and reached the Final of the Kent Senior Trophy played at Tonbridge, where they lost 0–4 to Beckenham Town. Between 14 September 2013 and 18 February 2014 the team achieved a then Ashford all time 10 consecutive league match winning run. United topped their league around Christmas, however fixture congestion owing to their cup exploits – with the team playing 12 matches in one three week period – led to a slight dip in form and they finished in second position.

The following season was in some ways a re-run of the previous one with a last 32 appearance in the FA Vase (losing heavily 0–5 at home to Norwich United, that seasons runaway champions of the Eastern Counties Football League) and a runners-up position in the league. A mid-autumn six league match winless run (D4; L2) derailed the 'Nuts and Bolts' promotion hopes and although the team  put together a new Ashford all-time record 13 consecutive league victories they couldn't top eventual 2014–15 league champions Phoenix Sports (although the 'Nuts and Bolts' were the only club to beat them in a league match). Over the season leading scorer Stuart Zanone, who had signed seven competitive games into the season, scored 47 goals in 35 appearances  and not only surpassed the Ashford club post-war single season goalscoring record of 46 goals in 59 appearances (established by Alan Morton playing for Ashford Town forty-two years previously) but also in scoring in 7 consecutive league appearances between 8 November to 27 December 2014 he eclipsed Mo Takalo's "United" six consecutive goal record. Additionally Zanone registered 28 goals in 11 consecutive away games starting on 18 October 2014 and ending on 24 March 2015 with a club record all seven goals in a 7–0 victory over Lingfield. Unsurprisingly Zanone collected the league Golden Boot award for the season

As the 2014–15 season ended the club announced that the natural grass pitch at the Homelands (which had a history of poor drainage leading to postponed fixtures) was to be replaced during the close season with a synthetic 3G playing surface – this mooted as being the first stage of a sports village redevelopment plan to ensure a steady source of income for the club owners. There were delays in construction of the pitch which led to early 2015–16 season match postponements but these were only the start of events sparked by the pitch installation: a dispute with the financiers of the project led to them demanding immediate repayment of the loan they'd advanced and although the club repudiated their claims they couldn't prevent court proceedings in which the ownership of the Homelands ground was transferred to the finance company; in February news broke of a disputed winding-up petition being filed against the football club company – which the court promptly overturned; and the league levied a 10 league point deduction against the team owing to the financial situation.
The football club owners continued to dispute and legally challenge matters and this rolled on beyond the seasons' end.

These on-going disputes detracted from an otherwise more than satisfactory 2015–16 season on the pitch – albeit it was without silverware. It began inauspiciously when on 15 August 2015, after just two games of the campaign and following a heavy 1–5 loss in the FA Cup to fellow SCEFL side Cray Valley PM, the manager Paul Chambers was relieved of his duties after a stay of four years and 171 mostly won matches. Former Ashford Town defender Danny Lye – who had returned to the Homelands as a player in December 2014 – was appointed as player-manager until the end of the season. The team started slowly over his first ten league matches (W4; D2; L4) but over the remaining 25 league matches there were 18 victories (W18; D5; L2) and a 14 match unbeaten run incorporating 12 wins. The team finished third in the table (which would have been second, nine points behind winners Greenwich Borough had it not been for the ten points deduction). The club progressed two rounds further than previously in the FA Vase: after a replay win away in the north-east at Gateshead based Northern League Dunston UTS (a club record 660 mile round trip) the ‘Nuts and Bolts’ reached the last eight before being eliminated 0–3 at one-time Southern League rival Salisbury, who were romping away with that seasons Wessex Football League title. It was disappointment once again in the Kent Senior Trophy final where, after a goalless draw, the team lost out in a penalty shoot-out 6–7 to Sheppey United.

The previous season's top scorer Stuart Zanone left early in the 2015–16 season and was replaced by veteran forward Shaun Welford (brought in as player-assistant manager from Hythe Town). Zanone's record of scoring in seven consecutive matches was eclipsed by Welford who scored in nine consecutive league matches - which numerically equalled Lee McRobert’s sequence from 1999–2000 (although those weren't all league games). Welford finished the campaign as United's top scorer, netting on 37 occasions - 31 league plus 6 cup goals.

The club began the 2016–17 season with the legal dispute from the previous campaign unresolved. Against this backdrop the returning player coach Danny Lye put together a strong squad – with the club asking the supporters to contribute towards the playing budget. Off-pitch matters continued to concern the supporters: there was an administrative dispute, ultimately resolved, with the FA over registration for acceptance for promotion; then a scare over the suitability for matches of the 3G pitch at the Homelands. However mid-March brought positive news that the legal dispute between the club and financiers who owned the ground had been settled and ownership of the Homelands had been transferred back to the football club company and subsequently the pitch and facilities passed ground grading requirements. A new director, Derek Pestridge, was appointed and he made a £500,000 interest-free loan to the club company against which a legal charge over the stadium (which had been re-introduced into the company's financial statements following settlement of legal/finance matters) was established in his favour.

On the pitch the team challenged all season at the top of the SCEFL Premier Division and ultimately prevailed over title rivals Crowborough Athletic to clinch the 2016–17 SCEFL Premier League title and promotion to the South Division of the Isthmian League. It was a season of records: most league wins (30 out of 38 games); most league points (92); highest Homelands league attendance for Ashford United of 807; and in scoring 119 goals, the Ashford club record of 115 scored by Ashford Town in the Kent League of 1931–32 was eclipsed; Shaun Welford with a hat-trick in the season's last match created a new all-time club record of scoring 48 goals in 42 competitive matches (with 37 and the Golden Boot in league matches) beating Start Zanone's 47 goal record from two seasons previously. There was also victory in the Kent Senior Trophy where, after being runners-up for the previous two years, United lifted the trophy as champions with a 2–1 win (both goals from Shaun Welford) over Cray Valley PM on neutral turf at Maidstone.

With the legal/stadium disputes settled and promotion achieved the close of the 2016–17 season saw United return to where their forerunners Ashford Town had been when they ceased existence seven years previously.

Isthmian League South / South East Division (2017– )
Ashford returned to the Isthmian League for the 2017–18 season. Any thoughts of a successful season were quickly extinguished with defeats in the first two games which led to the club parting company with manager Danny Lye and the subsequent departure of experienced players. Youth team coach Jason Whitmore was appointed manager but having to rebuild the squad – and in the interim fielding inexperienced youth team players – led to a continued run of poor results including an autumn run of 12 league matches without a win (10 losses; 2 draws). During January the club appointed experienced former manager of Greenwich Borough Gary Alexander as Whitmore's assistant with a plan for the former to take over as manager the following season. There was a significant turnover of players with 78 players donning the club's jersey in the 46 match league season; the highest match starts by any player was Pat Kingwell with 32 (from a potential 51 matches); Jon Difford played in the highest number of games 33 including 6 substitute appearances; 31 players played in 3 or fewer matches; there were 21 goalscorers with Max Watters topping the list with 8 (from 27 appearances). The previous season had been one of positive records, this one featured negatives: in conceding 111 goals over the league campaign it was the first time that in excess of over 100 had been conceded by either Town or United; the goal difference of negative 51 was similarly an unwanted record; the 28 league losses was the worst since the record 29 in the 1997–98 campaign; the Nuts and Bolts 9–1 defeat at Cray Wanderers was the seasons record scoring/winning margin across all the league's games and worst ever for United. With ten points from their final six league matches the team scrambled to 21st placed finish (from 24 clubs) and maintained their league status.

There was a splitting of the South Division of the Isthmian League leading into the 2018–19 season and United were now in the South East Division. With Gary Alexander in position as manager the season started well with three wins. This though was followed by a seven league match winless run (D2, L5) and early exit from FA Cup and FA Trophy competitions. Three successive league wins in November looked to have got the team back on track but couldn't save manager Alexander who was sacked (via a Saturday evening text message) at the end of November. He was immediately replaced by former Ashford Town player Tommy Warrilow who had become available following the early season demise of Thamesmead Town and who had a solid non-league management record in spells at Tonbridge Angels and Cray Wanderers. Under the new manager over the remaining 23 matches of the season the team won 15, drew 3 and lost 5. With the league second fewest goals conceded and second highest goal difference the team achieved a fourth-placed finish in the league and a promotion play-off spot. Danny Parish was top scorer over the league campaign with 24 goals from the 26 games he played, with Sam Corne second with 15. In the play-off semi-final the 'Nuts and Bolts' played on a Monday night in front of 1,123 spectators at Hastings United and ran-out 3–2 victors; twice coming from a goal behind with strikes from Jay May and Sam Corne and the latter scored a penalty one minute from the end of extra time for the winning goal. In the promotion final Ashford lost 2–1 after extra-time away at Horsham although even had they won, owing to the arrangement of the 'step four' play-off scheme (with only five promotion spots available, decided from regular season league points per game basis, for the seven league play-off winners), they would not have not been promoted. Behind the scenes in the spring of 2019 there were changes concerning Denise Peach: she ceased to be a Director but made a loan to the club (secured against the club's property) of £210,291.

The 2019-20 and 2020-21 seasons were affected by the COVID-19 pandemic with both seasons foreshortened and no promotion or relegation. The club rode high in the table during the 2019-20 season and at suspension of the league in March 2020 with thirty of their scheduled thirty-eight fixtures completed the team were second in the table (albeit only fifth on a points per game basis). The teams had the best away record in the league (P16; W11; D1; L4) but home form (P14; W8; D1; L5) was below the standard of the other leading clubs. With 75 goals scored the Nuts and Bolts were the league's leading scorers with David Smith notching 20 and Aaron Condon 14 of these. The season was cancelled in early March 2020 and was followed by a six month close season. The following 2020-21 season hardly happened at all with only six league matches completed before curtailment at the end of October 2020 – with the team showing a disappointing return of three defeats from their four home league matches. There was little cup success in either campaign with FA cup first qualifying round exits in both seasons and first and second qualifying exits respectively in the FA Trophy. Off the field, in September 2020 Director Derek Pestridge made his second secured (against property) loan to the football club company of £213,435.50, and in June 2021 Paul Bowden-Brown was appointed by the club as Director of Football - he had previously been associated with the club in 2011.

The 2021–22 Isthmian League South East Division season saw a welcome return of a full football program with fans in attendance. The season started in a familiar pattern for the club with early exits from the FA Cup at the preliminary round stage (a 6–5 penalty defeat in a replay at home to Chatham) and a second qualifying round exit from the FA Trophy, 0–2 at Hastings. The start to the league campaign was though exceptional with 11 wins in the first 15 matches (W11; D2; L2) and at the end of November the team were at the head of the table. Form dipped thereafter and there were 5 defeats and 2 draws over the next 10 league games (including a 1–5 reverse at mid-table Three Bridges). Results recovered and 8 wins from the next 11 matches saw the ‘Nuts and Bolts’ secure a second placed finish in the table 13 points adrift from league champions Hastings United - who had won 2–1 at Homelands in front of an Ashford United new record league attendance of 1,134 (the highest seen at the Homelands for a league match since 2004-05 when 1,057 were present at the Ashford Town match versus upwardly mobile AFC Wimbledon). Over the last 25 game-weeks of the season the team spent 20 of these in second spot and after a couple of momentum draining losses in the last two league matches (with 2nd spot already secured) they progressed into the promotion play-offs. The semi-final was a tight 1–0 victory over Cray Valley; the final itself was an anti-climactic 0–2 loss to Herne Bay in front of a record home crowd for Ashford United of 1,865 (the 4th highest all-time competitive match Homelands attendance to date).

Top scorer over the 2021–22 league campaign was Gary Lockyer (a former player from the teams’ inaugural 2011–12 Kent Invicta League campaign), who after joining in mid-November from local Southern Counties East Football League Premier division Kennington notched 15 goals in 20 starting and 4 substitute appearances. Two players were tied for second best on 10 goals each: Tommy Fagg over 22 plus 2 games as substitute – including a hat-trick in the opening day of the seasons 3-1 win over Burgess Hill, part of personal 5 goal haul over the campaigns’ first 4 league matches (his season was subsequently interrupted through injury and ill discipline – 2 red cards and 5 yellow); and Luke Burdon from 9 starting plus 23 substitute appearances (from which he scored 6 of his goals). Most league appearances were unusually not from the goalkeeper but from long-serving midfielder Josh Wisson with 35 (including 2 as substitute) from the 38 league matches – he passed the milestone of over 100 appearances for the ‘Nuts and Bolts’ over the campaign. The role of custodian had been shared: first choice Jordan Carey was injured in the early season cup loss to Chatham (but returned to duty later in the season) and his place was temporarily taken by Damian Niemczycki (6 league matches) and Tyler McCarthy (20 league matches) who both recorded better comparative stats in terms of fewer losses and clean sheets than Carey (over his 12 matches).

Off the pitch the primary news early in April 2022 was that of the gaining of planning consent to further develop the unused 9.5 acres of the Homelands site (see the Stadium section below). Shortly afterwards it was announced that Director of Football, Paul Bowden-Brown was stepping down from his position. Also there was confirmation that the charge created as security against the loan made to the club in 2019 by former Director Denise Peach was no longer in place.

Players

Managers

Rivalry and Supporters
From the earlier Ashford United days the clubs rivals were chiefly Chatham, Maidstone United and Tunbridge Wells Rangers. As the club transformed first into Ashford Railway Works and then Ashford Town, the rivals became increasingly the neighbouring East Kent clubs: Folkestone, Dover, Margate and Hastings. Following Ashford's move into the Isthmian League and the eroding of the relative status of the leagues in which the 'Nuts and Bolts' have competed teams from North Kent/South London and East Sussex have mostly replaced former rivals as playing opponents and the focus of supporters rivalry.

Following the formation of Ashford United and their progression into step 9 of the football pyramid the likes of Sevenoaks Town, Greenwich Borough, Beckenham Town, Tunbridge Wells, Sheppey United and Fisher came to the fore as rivals with the latter three having supporters similarly vocal to those of the 'Nuts and Bolts'

Since 2011, United have boasted higher attendances than around 80% of other English teams at Step 8 & 9 level. Their supporter's independent social media network is one of the largest in non-league below the National League. The vocal section renamed itself the FAMOUS NUTS AND BOLTS in 2018 and claim to be one of the largest in Kent at this level.

United fans became famous across the Football network in early 2018 when they took around 90 fans to their away game in Guernsey, a number almost triple the previous record held by Hastings United when they took 31 a year prior.

Stadium

Ashford have played at the Homelands Stadium since its construction in 1989. They had returned to the town after a two year ground share at Folkestone, following leaving their previous home ground of 56 years at Essella Park, Ashford. The record attendance at the Homelands ground of 3,363 was set at the first round 1994–95 FA Cup match against Fulham.

The originally installed natural grass pitch at the Homelands had a history of poor drainage and wear that had over the years caused match postponements. To rectify this at the conclusion of the 2014–15 season the club began installing a new synthetic 3G pitch (of a FIFA 2 rated standard) for use the following season. Its construction was delayed and it was not available until shortly after the commencement of the 2015–16 season.

Many teams have ground-shared at the Homelands: Conference South club Margate for the 2004 season during which their   Hartsdown Park stadium was undergoing redevelopment; Maidstone United played at the stadium for two seasons from 2009 whilst their Gallagher Stadium ground was built; SCEFL club Canterbury City were tenants between 2014 and 2017, they were a nomad club without their own home ground and had previously played at Herne Bay and subsequently at Faversham.

From the 2018–19 season Kennington who compete in the Southern Counties East Football League began to play their home matches at the Homelands.

In April 2022, a long mooted major redevelopment plan of the Homelands site was announced. This included; the installation of an additional full size 3G football pitch with changing facilities; building ten start-up business units; the erection of a new canopy for fans at the west end of the main pitch; and improvements to car parking areas - all expected to be completed for the 2023–24 season. An indoor sports hall was proposed as a future addition.(Proposed plan:)

Previous Ashford Teams’ Stadiums
South Eastern Rangers: Newton Green, Newtown, Ashford.
Ashford United: 1891–1898, Victoria Ground, behind the Victoria Hotel (now Victoria Point), Ashford; 1898–1907, western end of Godinton Road (beyond railway bridge), Ashford.
Ashford Railway Works: Railway Works ground, off Newtown Road (under railway arches, Willesbough side of river Stour), Ashford.
Ashford Town: 1930-1931, the Railway Works ground; 1931-1987, Essella Park, Essella Road, Willesborough, Ashford; 1987-1989 Cheriton Road, Folkestone; 1989-2010, The Homelands, Kingsnorth, Ashford.

Honours

FIRST TEAM

League
 East Kent League Division 1
Runners-up: 1898–1899
 East Kent League
Champions: (As Ashford Railway Works) 1908–09
 Kent League: Division 2, Eastern Section
Champions: (As Ashford Railway Works) 1911–12, 1912–13, 1913–14, 1919–20, 1927–28
Runners-up: (As Ashford Railway Works) 1909–10
 Folkestone and District Senior League
Champions: (As Ashford Railway Works) 1909–10
Runners-up: (As Ashford Railway Works) 1919–20
Kent League
Champions: 1948–49
Runners-up: 1931–32
Southern League: Southern Division
Runners-up: 1986–87, 1995–96
 Southern Counties East Football League
Premier Division Champions: 2016–17
Runners-up: 2013–14, 2014–15
Cup Competitions
 Kent County Badge
Runners-up: (as South-Eastern Rangers) 1886, 1888
 Kent Senior Cup
Winners: 1892–93, 1958–59, 1962–63, 1992–93, 1995–96
Runners-up: 1901–02, 1902–03, 1961–62, 1980–81, 1981–82
Kent League Cup
 Winners: 1938–39
Runners-up: 1950–51
 Kent Floodlight Trophy
Winners: 1961–62
 Kent Senior Trophy
Winners: 2016–17
Runners-up: 2013–14, 2015–16

RESERVES

League
Kent League Division 2
Champions: 1952–53, 1955–56
Runners-up: 1948–49, 1984–85, 1987–88, 1988–89, 1990–91, 2007–08
Seanglian League
Champions: 1961–62
Kent Amateur League: East
Champions: 1931–32
Cup Competitions
Kent League Cup
Runners-up: 1971–72 
Kent League League 2 Cup
Winners: 1949–50, 1952–53, 2007–08
Runners-up: 1986–87
Kent Intermediate Cup
Winners: 1953–54
Runners-up: 1952–53, 1955–56, 1957–58

Club records
Record attendance
 At Essella Park: 6,525 v Crystal Palace, FA Cup first round 1959–60
 At The Homelands: 3,363 v Fulham, FA Cup first round, 1994–95
 At an away ground: 13,900 at Griffin Park, Brentford v Brentford, FA Cup first round, 1959–60
Most appearances: Peter McRobert: 765 (1974–2003)
Individual Goal Scoring Records
Most in Ashford Career: Dave Arter: 197 (1983–1986,1988–1990,1994–1996)
Most in a single season: (since 1959–60): Shaun Welford: 48 (in 42 matches, SCEFL 2016–17)
Most in a single game: (since 1959–60): Stuart Zanone: 7 v Lingfield (away) SCEFL 24 March 2015
In Consecutive League Games: 9, Shaun Welford SCEFL 2015–16 (equals Lee McRobert (not all League matches) from 1999–2000)
Single Game Records
Win: 15–0 v Erith & Belvedere, Kent League 28 April 1937 
Defeats: 3–14 v Folkestone Reserves, Kent League 1933–34; 0–12 v Woolwich Arsenal, FA Cup 14 October 1893
Team Consecutive Single Season League Match Sequences
Wins: 13, SCEFL 2014–15
Draws 6, Southern League 1961–62 (expands to 9 for all competitive matches)
Defeats: 7, Kent League 1932–33 & Southern League 1997–98
Unbeaten: 20 (won 16, drawn 4) Kent League 1948–49
Without a Win 15 (drawn 7, lost 8) Southern League 1996–97
Highest transfer fee
Paid: £7,000 to Sittingbourne for J Ross and D Arter, 1994
Received: £20,000 from Sittingbourne for Lee McRobert, 1993
Best Performances FA Knock-out CompetitionsFA Cup: Second Round (3): 1960–61, 1966–67 & 1996–97FA Trophy: Semi-final, 1972–73FA Vase:''' Quarter-final 2015–16

References

External links
 Ashford United FC official website
 Nuts and Bolts Archive, History of Ashford Town & Ashford United
 Football Club History Database
 Non-League Football matters

Ashford, Kent
 
Association football clubs established in 1891
1891 establishments in England
Football clubs in Kent
Kent Football League (1894–1959)
Southern Football League clubs
Isthmian League
Kent Invicta Football League
Southern Counties East Football League
Football clubs in England
Companies that have entered administration in the United Kingdom